Torchin' is a studio album by Frankie Laine released in 1958 on Columbia Records.

Track listing

References 

1958 albums
Frankie Laine albums
Columbia Records albums